Melker Olle Jonsson (born 10 July 2002) is a Swedish footballer who plays for Landskrona BoIS as a defender.

Career

Personal life 
Melker is the son of former Sweden striker Mattias Jonson.

References

External links 
 Djurgården profile 

2002 births
Living people
Association football forwards
Footballers from Stockholm
Swedish footballers
Sweden youth international footballers
Allsvenskan players
Djurgårdens IF Fotboll players
Superettan players